Eastern High School is a public high school in Sardinia, Brown County, Ohio, USA. It is the only high school in the Eastern Local School District.

Athletics

The school colors are red and white. The mascot is the Warrior. Eastern High School has a golf team, girls' and boys' soccer teams, baseball, softball, bowling, girls' and boys' basketball, golf, track & field and cross country teams. They had back to back Final Four appearances in the Women's High School Basketball tournament in 2016 and 2017.  The school is also home to the Eastern Warrior Guard Marching Band, which has been to state finals in back to back seasons, 2017 and 2018.

References

External links
 

High schools in Brown County, Ohio
Public high schools in Ohio